Cleistogenes  is a genus of Eurasian flowering plants in the grass family.

The name Cleistogenes was for a time considered an invalidly published name synonymous with Kengia, but revisions to the Code of Nomenclature have reversed this situation. Cleistogenes is now the correct name.

 Species
 Cleistogenes caespitosa Keng - China
 Cleistogenes festucacea Honda - China
 Cleistogenes gatacrei (Stapf) Bor - Afghanistan, Pakistan
 Cleistogenes hackelii (Honda) Honda - China, Japan, Korea
 Cleistogenes hancei Keng - China, Primorye
 Cleistogenes kitagawae Honda - Hebei, Liaoning, Mongolia, Russian Far East, Siberia
 Cleistogenes mucronata Keng f. - China
 Cleistogenes nedoluzhkoi Tzvelev  - Primorye
 Cleistogenes polyphylla Keng f. - China
 Cleistogenes ramiflora Keng f. & C.P.Wang - Inner Mongolia
 Cleistogenes serotina (L.) Keng - Eurasia from Spain to Kazakhstan
 Cleistogenes songorica (Roshev.) Ohwi  - China, Kazakhstan, Kyrgyzstan, Mongolia, Russia, Turkmenistan, Uzbekistan
 Cleistogenes squarrosa (Trin. ex Ledeb.) Keng - China, Kazakhstan, Mongolia, Russia, Caucasus

 formerly included
see Orinus 
 Cleistogenes kokonorica - Orinus kokonorica 
 Cleistogenes thoroldii - Orinus thoroldii

References

Chloridoideae
Poaceae genera
Grasses of Asia
Grasses of Europe
Taxa named by Carl Linnaeus